SAE J3105 is a recommended practice for automated connection devices (ACD) that mate chargers with battery electric buses and heavy-duty vehicles. The practice is maintained by the SAE International with the formal title "Electric Vehicle Power Transfer System Using Conductive Automated Connection Devices Recommended Practice", and was first issued in January 2020. It covers the general physical, electrical, functional, testing, and performance requirements for automated conductive DC power transfer systems intended for heavy duty vehicles, focusing primarily on transit buses.

J3105 defines a common automated conductive charging system architecture so that any vehicle selecting one of the supplemental specific ACD implementations can use any charger that complies with that specific implementation, regardless of manufacturer, similar to how the earlier IEC 62196, SAE J1772, and SAE J3068 standards define the characteristics for a manually-plugged electric vehicle supply equipment interface.

History 
SAE formed the Medium and Heavy-Duty Vehicle Conductive Charging Task Force in 2016 to develop a recommended practice for heavy-duty electric vehicle conductive charging. Participants in the Task Force included transit bus manufacturers (Gillig, New Flyer, Nova Bus, Proterra), charger manufacturers (ABB, Heliox, Opbrid, Siemens, Toshiba), interface manufacturers (Furrer+Frey, SCHUNK, Stäubli, Stemmann), electric utilities (EPRI, SMUD, SCE), transit operators (APTA, CTA, King County Metro, LACMTA, NYCTA), and interested parties (ANL, CalStart, CEC, CTE).

The Task Force first published the SAE J3068 recommended practice in 2018, building on work from existing international standards for charging using three-phase AC power. J3068 defines a manual Type 2 connector that can be used for both AC charging or DC charging up to 1000 V.

General design characteristics
Transit operators may use opportunity charging to extend the range of electric buses while stopped on a layover. This is in contrast to depot charging, where the buses are charged at a common garage or storage facility while out of service. An ACD system may be used for both opportunity and depot charging. For instance, the Schipol Airport bus depot has overhead chargers at both 30 kW (depot charging) and 450 kW (opportunity charging) for its all-electric bus fleet.

J3105 defines two current levels of DC charging, with supply voltage from 250 to 1000 V:
 Up to 600 A (350 kW)
 Up to 1200 A (1200 kW)

These levels are mutually compatible; for instance, a Level 1 vehicle could connect to a Level 2 charger and would receive an appropriate amount of power. Specific requirements for the charging station and communication are governed by IEC 61851-23 and ISO 15118.

When a vehicle approaches a charger, wireless communications via IEEE 802.11n will pair the vehicle and charger. The initial communication will be used to guide the vehicle's driver to an appropriate position so the connection can be made, and communications will go through the Control Pilot interface after the vehicle is connected.

Only four interface connections are defined by J3105. The specific physical interfaces are defined in the supplemental recommended practices.
  DC Power (+)
  DC Power (–)
  Ground / Protective Earth
  Control Pilot

Specific charging implementations
J3105 includes three supplemental recommended practices for specific ACD implementations:
 J3105-1 "Infrastructure-Mounted Cross Rail Connection" (or "Cross rail"): the overhead charging station extends contacts down on a pantograph to meet roof-mounted vehicle rails
 J3105-2 "Vehicle-Mounted Pantograph Connection" (or "Bus up"): the vehicle extends a pantograph up from its roof to meet overhead charging station contacts
 J3105-3 "Enclosed Pin and Socket Connection": the charging station extends a pin horizontally into a vehicle's roof-mounted socket

The physical characteristics are described in the specific ACD implementations. Each of the recommended practices for specific ACD implementations includes the conductor dimensions and spacing, and the required alignment and connection procedure.

A small amount of misalignment is tolerated, depending on the specific implementation:

Notes

Cross rail (J3105-1)

In the cross rail ACD implementation (officially, "Infrastructure-mounted Cross Rail Connection"), a curbside charging station includes an overhead structure overhanging the street. After the bus pulls up to the charging station, contacts are lowered from the overhead charger on a pantograph and connect to rails mounted on the forward roof of the bus. 

The cross rail implementation is marketed commercially as OppCharge (opportunity charging) and the OppCharge consortium, led by Volvo Buses, includes several bus and charging infrastructure manufacturers. The first OppCharge station was deployed at the end of 2016 in Bertrange, Luxembourg by ABB for hybrid buses built by Volvo. In the United States, the first OppCharge stations were deployed in 2019 by New Flyer Infrastructure Solutions as on-route chargers for the New York City Transit Authority along its M42 route.

Bus up (J3105-2)

The bus up ACD implementation (officially, "Vehicle-mounted Pantograph Connection") also uses an overhead charger, but the charging contacts remain fixed in place while the bus extends a pantograph up from its roof to meet the charger. The charging contacts are on the underside of a long hooded enclosure to facilitate the bus and charger contact connection.

The bus up implementation has been adopted by VDL Bus & Coach using chargers provided by Heliox, with both companies based in The Netherlands. The  charging depots at Schipol Airport were the largest electric bus charger installation in Europe when they were completed in 2018, including 23 450 kW opportunity chargers and 84 30 kW depot chargers from Heliox, servicing a fleet of 100 VDL Citea SLFA articulated buses equipped with bus-up pantographs. Heliox also introduced a dual-interface system compatible with both top-down (J3105-1) and bus-up (J3105-2) vehicles in 2018.

Pin and socket (J3105-3)

In the pin and socket ACD implementation (officially, "Enclosed Pin and Socket Connection"), a pin is inserted horizontally from a curbside charging station into a socket with a guiding funnel on the roof of the bus.

The pin and socket implementation was developed by Stäubli, who market it as the Quick Charging Connector (QCC). QCC has been implemented on a test basis at ports in Hamburg (6 charging stations and 25 automated guided vehicles [AGV]) and Singapore (3 stations and 22 AGVs). In addition, the Port of Long Beach has announced its intentions to convert an existing fleet of 33 diesel-powered tractors to battery-electric drivetrains, which will include the installation of charging stations. The quantity of charging stations, built by Tritium and fitted with the Stäubli QCC system, will be sufficient to allow all 33 tractors to be charged simultaneously.

Rejected implementation 
A fourth ACD implementation ("Infrastructure-Mounted Blade Connection" or "Blade") was part of the preliminary development, but marketing was discontinued during development of the J3105 standard and the Blade implementation was not included in the initial issue.

Blade

The blade ACD implementation ("Infrastructure-mounted Blade Connection") is similar to the cross rail implementation, as both use an overhead charging device with a passive vehicle contact. However, in the blade implementation, a funnel-like "scoop" on the roof of the bus is used to mechanically guide the charger shoe onto a "blade" charging contact at the rear roof of the bus. The blade implementation is slower to engage than the cross rail, but the docking process to mate the vehicle to the charger is more automated.

The blade implementation was developed by Proterra for its line of battery-electric buses. Proterra offered royalty-free access to its patented design starting in 2016. Despite this, the blade design was not adopted by other manufacturers and the blade implementation was eventually dropped from J3105 during development, some time after 2018.  Proterra has since adopted J3105-1 (pantograph-down) or J3105-2 (pantograph-up) charging systems for newer buses.

Notes

References

External links
 SAE Medium and Heavy Duty Vehicle Conductive Charging Task Force
 
 
 

Charging stations
International Electrotechnical Commission
Mains power connectors
Plug-in hybrid vehicle industry
Automotive standards